Renan Zanatta Buiatti (born 10 January 1990) is a Brazilian volleyball player. He was part of the Brazil men's national volleyball team that finished in second place at the 2014 World Championship in Poland.

Sporting achievements

Clubs
 FIVB Club World Championship
  Betim 2016 – with Sada Cruzeiro

 National championships
 2013/2014  Brazilian Championship, with SESI São Paulo

Youth national team
 2009  FIVB U21 World Championship

Individual awards
 2009: FIVB U21 World Championship – Best Blocker
 2013: Pan American Games – Best Opposite
 2013: Pan American Cup – Best Opposite

External links
Player profile at WorldofVolley.com 
Player profile at LegaVolley.it 
Player profile at Volleybox.net 
2014 FIVB World Championship – Team Brazil

References

1990 births
Living people
Brazilian men's volleyball players
Place of birth missing (living people)
Volleyball players at the 2015 Pan American Games
Pan American Games silver medalists for Brazil
Pan American Games medalists in volleyball
Universiade medalists in volleyball
Universiade bronze medalists for Brazil
Medalists at the 2011 Summer Universiade
Medalists at the 2015 Pan American Games
Opposite hitters
21st-century Brazilian people